St. Stanislaus Kostka Church in Pittsburgh, Pennsylvania, referred to in Polish as Kościół Świętego Stanisława Kostki is a historic church of the Roman Catholic Diocese of Pittsburgh. Located in the Strip District in Pittsburgh, Pennsylvania, United States, it is a prime example of the so-called 'Polish Cathedral' style of churches.  It is known also as 21st and Smallman Street Church.  It is listed on the U.S. National Register of Historic Places.

History of Saint Stanislaus Kostka
The congregation was formed in 1873 when 200 Polish families banded together to form the St. Stanislaus Kostka Beneficial Society. The first pastor was Antoni Klawiter, who arrived in October 1875 and left in 1877. The availability of unskilled mill jobs in Pittsburgh in the late 19th century attracted a flood of immigrants from Eastern Europe. By 1915, more than 80% of Strip District residents were foreign-born, and 30% were Polish. St. Stanislaus Kostka Church was constructed in 1891, designed by Pittsburgh architect Frederick C. Sauer (1860–1942).

In March 1936 there was a disastrous flood on Saint Patrick's Day. Water flooded the church as high as the top of the wainscoting on the walls. The pews were afloat and the Pastor was trapped in the rectory on the second floor. In December 1936, an explosion at the Pittsburgh Banana Company weakened the towers and the original baroque style bonnets were removed. Examples of the bonnet style are still found on the top of the sidewall pilasters and the ventilation cupola on the center of the roof. Three of the medallion windows over the altars were also covered over.

On September 20, 1969, Cardinal Karol Wojtyła, the future Pope John Paul II, visited and offered prayers at St. Stanislaus Kostka. After cordial greetings, the Cardinal is quoted as commenting on how beautiful the church was and how it reminded him of the churches in Poland. He knelt in prayer before the Blessed Sacrament and then to the Side Altar of the Blessed Virgin Mary, now the location of a humble memorial to the Pope.

Architecture of Saint Stanislaus Kostka
Saint Stanislaus Kostka's architectural style is a blend of Romanesque and Baroque, with Byzantine influences. Construction of the present Saint Stanislaus Kostka church was started in April 1891, and the church was consecrated on July 31, 1892. The church is built on the ground surface, and there is no basement. In 1936, the church endured flood and explosion damage.

The twin towers support a total of seven bells. The right tower holds the St. Michel bell , the St. Barbara bell  and the St. Anthony bell . The left tower holds the St. Casimer bell , the St. Joseph bell , the St. Rosa bell  and the St. Stanislaus bell . Five of these bells were electrified in 1956.

The stained glass figure windows were produced in Munich, Germany, at the Royal Bavarian Art Institute at a cost of $27,672—a major expenditure for that time. Compared with today's dollar value it would cost almost $538,000. According to experts, the windows in the Saint Stanislaus Kostka Church are some of the best period "Munich Style" stained glass in the United States.

There are three Latin inscriptions in the church interior.

On the front of old main altar:
Se Nascens Deditsocium "By his birth He offers himself as a companion"

On the altar canopy: 
Se Moriens In Praetium "Dying, he offers himself as victim."

On the window over the altar canopy: 
Se Regnans Dat In Praemium "Reigning, He offers himself as a reward."

On the Christ the King center window above the crown, in Christ's hand is a banner which reads: 
Qui Vicerit Dabei Sedere, Mecum In Throno Meo "He who has conquered (God) will grant you to sit with me on my throne"

The original interior also did not have the murals we see today as the murals have changed over the years. The current paintings in the semi-dome over the altar were done by the Italian artist, Vincent Scatena and were completed for the Golden Jubilee of the parish in 1925.

See also
Polish Hill
Immaculate Heart of Mary
Jozef Mazur
Polish Americans
Polish Roman Catholic Union of America
Roman Catholicism in Poland
Tadeusz Żukotyński
Sr. Maria Stanisia

References

External links
 

19th-century Roman Catholic church buildings in the United States
Roman Catholic churches in Pittsburgh
History of Catholicism in the United States
Pittsburgh History & Landmarks Foundation Historic Landmarks
Polish-American culture in Pittsburgh
Polish Cathedral style architecture
Churches on the National Register of Historic Places in Pennsylvania
Roman Catholic churches completed in 1892
Religious organizations established in 1873
Roman Catholic churches in Pennsylvania
Roman Catholic Diocese of Pittsburgh
National Register of Historic Places in Pittsburgh